Kani Shurik (also Romanized as Kānī Shūrīk; also known as Kānī Sharak and Kānī Sharīk) is a village in Beradust Rural District, Sumay-ye Beradust District, Urmia County, West Azerbaijan Province, Iran. At the 2006 census, its population was 191, in 31 families.

References 

Populated places in Urmia County